The women's 200 metre breaststroke competition of the swimming events at the 1987 Pan American Games took place on 10 August at the Indiana University Natatorium. The last Pan American Games champion was Kathy Bald of Canada.

This race consisted of four lengths of the pool, all in breaststroke.

Results
All times are in minutes and seconds.

Heats

Final 
The final was held on August 10.

References

Swimming at the 1987 Pan American Games
Pan